Solar power in France including overseas territories reached an installed capacity figure of 11.2 GW by the end of 2020.

The solar power capacity is set to continue expanding with a target of around 18–20 GW installed by 2023.  However, wavering political support for new installations slowed PV deployment since the record year of 2011, when 1,700 MW had been installed. However, the sector appears to have recovered its previous pace, with nearly 1,400 MW coming on line in the first half of 2021.

In January 2016, the  President of France, François Hollande, and the Prime Minister of India, Narendra Modi, laid the foundation stone for the headquarters of the International Solar Alliance (ISA) in Gwalpahari, Gurgaon, India. The ISA will focus on promoting and developing solar energy and solar products for countries lying wholly or partially between the Tropic of Cancer and the Tropic of Capricorn. The alliance of over 120 countries was announced at the Paris COP21 climate summit. One of the hopes of the ISA is that wider deployment will reduce production and development costs, and thus facilitate increased deployment of solar technologies, including in poor and remote regions.

History 
Solar PV installations in France started being substantial only from around 2008. Between 2009 and 2011 PV capacity grew almost tenfold, from a relatively low level. 

In its 2014 report "Global Market Outlook for Photovoltaics", the European Photovoltaic Industry Association (EPIA) not only blames the French government for a lack of support, but also criticizes it for having "hastily freeze or reduce support mechanisms" for further photovoltaic deployment. 
The EPIA also asserts that opposition from the conventional energy sector led to a negative image of PV technology in the public opinion. 
The French solar association SOLER urged the French government for more support and submitted a five-point plan in Spring 2014.

Solar power in France continued growing steadily and reached a cumulative photovoltaic capacity of 6.6 GW by the end of 2015, producing 6.7 TWh of electricity during the year.
In 2015 France was the country with the seventh largest solar PV installed capacity in the world. 
Around 903 MW of new installations were added during the year.

In 2016, France was ranked 4th in the EU by installed capacity and 14th in terms of PV capacity by inhabitant at 107.3 Wp/Inhab compared to the EU average of 197.8 Wp/Inhab for the year. The country's largest completed solar park to date was the 300 MW Cestas Solar Park. Approximately 560 MW of new installations were added during the year.

In 2018, the state-owned company EDF had plans to invest up to €25 billion in PV power generation, and introduce green electricity tariffs; the plan is projected to "develop 30 gigawatt of solar capacity in France between 2020 and 2035". Similarly, Total, the giant French oil and gas company, moved in 2021 toward more significant investment in solar with the purchase of a 20% stake in Adani Green Energy, one of the world's largest solar developers.

Insolation 

The insolation in France ranges from 3 sun hours/day in the north to 5 sun hours/day in the south. The output of a solar array is a function of age, temperature, tilt, shading, tracking, and insolation.

Photovoltaic installations 

Cumulative PV capacity in megawatt-peak (MWp) since 2000

Solar PV market by segment

Residential solar PV capacity 
According to a report on behalf of the European Commission by 2020 France would have an estimated  1,484 MW of residential solar PV capacity with  458,000 residential solar PV prosumers in the country representing  1.6% of households. The average size of residential solar PV systems is estimated to be 3.24 kW moving to 2030. The technical potential for residential solar PV in France is estimated at 34,810 MW. The payback time for residential Solar PV in France is 25.1 years as of 2015. Some of the advantages of small scale residential Solar include eliminating the need for extra land, keeping cost saving advantages in local communities and empowering households to become prosumers of renewable electricity and thus raising awareness of wasteful consumption habits and environmental issues through direct experience.

Large photovoltaic power stations 

A 17 MW floating solar plant was installed at Piolenc near the Rhône river in 2019.

List of owners of photovoltaic portfolios in France (2014)

See also

Solar power
Photovoltaic system
Wind power in France
Renewable energy in France
Solar power in the European Union
Renewable energy by country

Notes

References

External links
Les Mees M7 6.23 MW
Les Mees M45 11 MW